Albocosta is a genus of moths in the family Noctuidae.

Species
 Albocosta dulcis (Alphéraky, 1892)
 Albocosta ellapsa (Corti, 1927)
 Albocosta juldussi (Alphéraky, 1882)
 Albocosta lasciva (Staudinger, 1888)
 Albocosta musiva (Hübner, [1803])
 Albocosta musivula (Staudinger, 1895)
 Albocosta obliqua (Corti & Draudt, 1933)
 Albocosta refulgens (Warren, 1909)
 Albocosta stentzi (Lederer, 1853)
 Albocosta triangularis (Moore, 1867)
 Albocosta ulrici (Corti & Draudt, 1933)

References
 Albocosta at Markku Savela's Lepidoptera and Some Other Life Forms

Noctuinae